The TV Scoreboard (sometimes called RadioShack TV Scoreboard) is a Pong-like dedicated home video game console manufactured in Hong Kong from 1976 through the early '80s and made by Tandy. Distribution was handled exclusively by RadioShack.

The TV Scoreboard consisted of a left and right player, with dials or paddles on the hand held piece, and had multiple Pong era games. A variant also included a revolver-type light gun, which was used for a clay pigeon shooting game. Using additional cosmetic attachments to the light gun, the user could change its appearance to be that of a rifle. The games included but were not restricted to tennis, squash, hockey and practice. Games and game modes, including difficulty settings and serving settings, could be adjusted with switches. It ran on either an AC adapter, or six 1.5 V AA batteries.

The console belongs to the first generation of video game console and is based on one single chip, the General Instrument AY-3-8500.

Versions 

The system was also released in Germany under the name Universum Multispiel in 1977. Another very similar console is the 677 released in 1978 by Hanimex.

Games 
The following ten games are playable with the system:

Tennis
Football 
Squash
Practice (Pelota)
Target
Motorcycle 
Enduro
Motocross
Stunt Cycle
Drag Race

External links 
Photo of a shelf with various Pong clone consoles, e. g. the TV scoreboard

References

First-generation video game consoles
Products introduced in 1976
Light guns